Su Yu (August 10, 1907 – February 5, 1984), Courtesy name Yu (裕) was a Chinese military commander, a general of the People's Liberation Army.  He was considered by Mao Zedong to be among the best commanders of the PLA, only next to Peng Dehuai, Lin Biao and Liu Bocheng. Su Yu fought in the Second Sino-Japanese War and in the Chinese Civil War. He commanded the East China Field Army (renamed 3rd Field Army in 1949) during the Chinese Civil War. One of his most notable accomplishments was the capture of Shanghai.

After the Communist victory in the civil war, he held important posts in the new People's Republic of China, including that of PLA Chief of General Staff (1954–1958).

Early life 
Su Yu was born in Huitong County, Hunan province on August 10, 1907, to an ethnic Dong family. He was the third child among six siblings.  Su's father was Su Zhouheng (粟周亨), his mother was Liang Manmei (梁满妹), and the family depended on their 30 mu of inherited farmland for survival.  By the age of 18, Su Yu entered the Hunan Provincial 2nd Normal School at Changde for his post-secondary education.

Encirclement Campaigns and the Long March 
In 1926, he joined the Communist Youth League of China, and in 1927 joined the Communist Party of China.  He took part in the Northern Expedition and later the Nanchang Uprising. He emerged as one of the ablest guerrilla commanders in the Jiangxi Soviet during the 1930s. He did not join the Long March because he was tasked to fight against the Nationalist troops for a delaying action, and stayed in the south of Zhejiang until 1937.

Second Sino-Japanese War
After the breakout of the Second Sino-Japanese War in 1937, Su Yu was appointed Deputy Commander of the 2nd Detachment, and then in April 1938 commander of the Advanced Detachment of the New Fourth Army. 

During the war, Su won the Cheqiao Campaign against the Japanese Army, where his troops won a victory in the first battle against the Japanese troops at Weigang. After this, he had some other campaigns in Central Jiangsu against the Japanese aggressors in Nanjing, Wuhu and Lishui. 

During the war, Su Yu was the commander of the New Fourth Army's first division. He established himself as one of the Communist armed forces' most capable commanders, winning a series of skirmish campaigns against overwhelming enemies - the Kuomintang army, puppet regime forces and the Japanese army. By the end of the war, he was made Commander in Chief for the Communists' Central China's Military Region, covering a vast region in East Central China.

Chinese Civil War 

During the Civil War, Su Yu started as the second in command of the Communists' East China Field Army, eventually becoming second in command of the Third Field Army by the end of the war.

The successes of the battle persuaded Mao Zedong to change his military strategy of the Chinese Civil War, from traditional guerrilla style warfare to a more mobile and conventional approach. In July 1946, he led 30,000 Communist troops which triumphed over 120,000 American-armed Nationalist troops in seven different engagements, captured and killed 53,000 Kuomintang soldiers and stunned the country. The Central Jiangsu Campaign was the first of many of the brilliant campaigns that defined his legacy. He was also the commander of the PLA in the famous and much propagandized Menglianggu Campaign. In this campaign, the elite Nationalist Seventy-Fourth Division was completely destroyed after Su Yu succeeded in encircling the unit.

He was the major commander during the Huaihai Campaign (November 1948 to January 1949).  It was at his suggestion on January 22, 1948, that the two armies of Liu and Su followed a sudden-concentrate, sudden-disperse strategy that led to this decisive victory in late 1948, with the destruction of five Nationalist armies and the killing or capture of 550,000 Nationalist soldiers.  Su's army alone destroyed four Nationalist armies, and was the decisive force in destroying the fifth.

After the establishment of the PRC 

When the Korean War broke out in 1950, it was rumored that Su Yu was the commander that Mao wanted to lead the Chinese People's Volunteer Army into Korea, because of his experience of commanding a large number of troops. However, because of his illness (caused by shell fragments in the 1930s), neither Su nor Lin Biao (also rumored to be sick) was able to command the CVA. In the end, Peng Dehuai was selected.

He was made a da jiang (Grand General) in 1955, the most senior of the ten men to receive this rank. He served in numerous positions, including Chief of the People's Liberation Army General Staff Department in the 1950s. In his later years, he published The Memoirs of Su Yu (粟裕回忆录). He died in Beijing on February 5, 1984, at the age of 77. According to his last wish, his body was cremated and scattered to places he had fought.

Family 

Su Yu married Chu Qing (楚青) in February 1941. They had three children, all of whom joined the PLA. The eldest son Su Rongsheng (粟戎生) was born in 1942, followed by the second son Su Hansheng (粟寒生), and the youngest, a daughter Su Huining (粟惠宁), who married Chen Xiaolu (陈小鲁) in August 1975. Chen Xiaolu was the youngest son of Chen Yi who was Su Yu's direct superior during wartime.  According to Su Rongsheng, Su Yu was an extremely strict father. When Su Rongsheng was only three years old, Su Yu forced him to learn how to swim by giving him only a piece of bamboo as a float, and pushed him into the water in front of his mother, and prohibited anyone from attempting to save Su Rongsheng.  Su Yu's wife, Chu Qing was outraged and asked Su Yu angrily whether he was not worried about Su Rongsheng being drowned. But Su Yu answered that Su Rongsheng would have never learned how to swim any other way and besides, he was not being drowned.  At age of 20, Su Rongsheng joined the PLA and remained in service for 45 years, rising from an ordinary soldier to a lieutenant general when he retired as the deputy commander-in-chief of Beijing Military District at age 65.

See also 

 List of officers of the People's Liberation Army

References

Bibliography
 
 Ch'en, Jerome, et al. The Nationalist Era in China, 1927-1949. United Kingdom, Cambridge University Press, 1991.

External links 
 General Su Yu

1907 births
1984 deaths
Huitong
People from Huaihua
Chinese military personnel of World War II
People's Liberation Army generals from Hunan
People's Liberation Army Chiefs of General Staff
Vice Chairpersons of the National People's Congress
Kam people
Deputy Ministers of National Defense of the People's Republic of China